The finals and the qualifying heats of the men's 100 metre freestyle event at the 1998 World Aquatics Championships were held on Wednesday 14 January 1998 in Perth, Western Australia.

Results

Heats

Finals

A

B

See also
1996 Men's Olympic Games 100m Freestyle (Atlanta)
1997 Men's World SC Championships 100m Freestyle (Gothenburg)
1997 Men's European LC Championships 100m Freestyle (Seville)
2000 Men's Olympic Games 100m Freestyle (Sydney)

References

Swimming at the 1998 World Aquatics Championships